Ajak Chol (born 28 September 1990), better known by his stage names Bangs, Ur Boy Bangs, or Ur Boi Bangs, and formerly Bstar Bangs, is a South Sudanese-born, Australian hip hop artist. He released viral songs, "Take U to Da Movies" (2009) and "Meet Me on Facebook" (August 2010). In December 2009, he released an album, Hard 2 Be Up.

Early life and education

Ajak Chol was born in Juba, South Sudan in 1990. At the age of 11, he moved to Egypt with his family after his father married another wife. He spent two years there before emigrating to Australia with his family in 2003.

Career

In 2005, Chol formed the Nubian Knights, a hip-hop collective with fellow East African migrants Ezeldin Deng, Francis Dbuia, Abraham Adet, and Tong Bol. It resulted from the Footscray Community Arts Centre's ID Check project. The Nubian Knights produced a self-titled album and performed at St Jerome's Laneway Festival in 2009.
  
Chol recorded his debut album Hard 2 Be Up in mid-2008 at Gateway Living Music Studios in Footscray, Victoria, with producer John Favaro. In 2009, he posted "Take U to Da Movies" on YouTube as a satire on real rap music, where it became a viral hit after a few months. In 2010, he appeared at the Melbourne Big Day Out on the Lilyworld stage, he recorded two singles, titled "Meet Me on Facebook" and "Christmas Story". A percentage of profit from each sale of "Christmas Story" was donated to the International Rescue Committee, to aid their work in Sudan.

Bangs has collaborated with other Sudanese artists such as Ezu on his song "Hi Haters", Click Fablice on "I Know U Like", and Lil' Fablice on "Forever".

Bangs is signed to record label HSM Entertainment.

In 2011, Bangs released his second album Reflections. His most recent album is Bangz the Don, released in December 2012. He also released his first mixtape called NICE in September 2013 as a free download on HotNewHipHop, with part two released on 28 September 2014 – Bangs' birthday.

Bangs recorded his first album in 2008 in an Australian studio. By late 2009, his internet visibility began to grow as he increased in fame when his video became a viral hit. Bangs was discovered and interviewed on Eminem's internet radio station in 2009. When videos of the interview appeared on YouTube, his fame skyrocketed and several of his music videos accumulated millions of views.

Bangs became visible enough in the mainstream media that in 2010 Honda hired him for an advertisement. The advertisement asked, "How much rap can you fit into a Honda Jazz", and featured Bangs rapping to the beat of "Take U to Da Movies". On the 15 July 2015 episode of The Tonight Show Starring Jimmy Fallon, his song, "Take U to Da Movies", was used in a segment, "Do not Play", where both Fallon and the show's announcer, Steve Higgins, "ridiculed" and "mocked" him. On 19 July, Bangs released a diss track directed at Fallon, "Ur Boy Bangs – Response to Jimmy Fallon – Do not Watch". On 25 July, Bangs performed the track live to an audience at Laundry Bar in Fitzroy, Victoria

Bangs has cited that he was inspired to make music after hearing Soulja Boy. He is also quoted as saying his main musical influence is the rapper Chingy, with Dr. Dre as an additional inspiration for producing. He is also a fan of Kendrick Lamar, which can be seen in his "Keep Ur Head Up" video.

Discography

Albums

2009: Hard to Be Up
2011: Reflections

Singles

2010: "Take U to Da Movies"
2010: "Meet Me on Facebook"
2010: "Christmas Story"
2011: "Livin My Life" featuring EZU
2011: "Hi Haterz" featuring EZU
2012: "I Know U Like" featuring Click Fablice
2013: "It Was My Mistake"
2013: "Christmas Story Part II"
2019: “Take U To KFC”
2020: “Take U To Burger Kings/Hungry Jack’s”
2020: “Christmas Story Pt 6”
2022: “Take U to Starbucks”

Guest appearances

2016: "Ayo" B-Nasty featuring Bangs, Breezy & EZU

Tours 

Bangs completed his first tour of New Zealand in May 2014, playing shows in Auckland and Wellington.

References

External links
  "It's not easy doing what I do: Bangs" archived from the original on 16 January 2010 – Interview with Channel 9's Henri Paget, retrieved on 11 August 2019.

1990 births
Australian hip hop musicians
Australian male rappers
Living people
Musicians from Melbourne
People from Juba
South Sudanese emigrants to Australia
South Sudanese expatriates in Egypt
South Sudanese musicians
Australian YouTubers
21st-century Australian musicians
21st-century Australian male musicians